John Henry Martindale (March 20, 1815 – December 13, 1881) was an American lawyer, Union Army general, and politician.

Early life
Martindale was born in Sandy Hill, Washington County, New York, the son of Congressman Henry C. Martindale and Minerva Hitchcock Martindale. He entered the United States Military Academy at West Point in 1831, and graduated in 1835. He was appointed a brevet second lieutenant, but resigned from the Army the next year and began to study law. He was admitted to the bar in 1838, and commenced practice in Batavia, New York. In 1840, he married Emeline M. Holden. He was District Attorney of Genesee County from 1842 to 1846, and from 1848 to 1851. Then he removed to Rochester, New York.

Civil War
On August 9, 1861, Martindale was commissioned a brigadier general of volunteers in the Union Army, and was assigned to command a brigade within the Union Army of the Potomac. He later participated in all the battles of the Peninsula Campaign in V Corps. After the retreat from Malvern Hill, he was brevetted a major general of volunteers, and appointed Military Governor of Washington, D.C., a post he held from November 1862 to May 1864. Afterward he returned to field service, fighting with the XVIII Corps in the Bermuda Hundred Campaign, the Battle of Cold Harbor and the Siege of Petersburg, commanding the corps briefly in mid-July 1864. In September 1864 he resigned his commission because of bad health.

Return To Post-War Life
John H. Martindale was New York State Attorney General from 1866 to 1867, elected in 1865 on the Republican ticket.

In 1877, one of his clients tried to shoot him at his law office in Rochester, New York.

He died in Nice, Alpes-Maritimes, France, and was buried at the Batavia Cemetery in Batavia, New York.

See also

List of American Civil War generals (Union)
Fellows v. Blacksmith (1857)
New York ex rel. Cutler v. Dibble (1858)

References
 Eicher, John H., and Eicher, David J., Civil War High Commands, Stanford University Press, 2001, .
Political Graveyard
The "attempted murder" at his office, in the New York Times on November 26, 1877
His obituary, transcribed from the New York Times on December 14, 1881
List of New York Attorneys General, at Office of the NYSAG
Google Books Life Sketches of State Officers, Senators, and Members of Assembly in the State of New York in 1867 by S. R. Harlow and H. H. Boone (Weed, Parsons & Co., Albany NY, 1867)

External links
 at Generals and Brevets

1815 births
1881 deaths
United States Military Academy alumni
Union Army generals
People of New York (state) in the American Civil War
New York State Attorneys General
County district attorneys in New York (state)
People from Hudson Falls, New York
People from Batavia, New York
New York (state) Republicans
19th-century American politicians